Nazrul Islam Babu is a Bangladesh Awami League politician and the incumbent member of parliament for Narayanganj-2.

Early life
Babu was born on 10 March 1967. He was general secretary of the Bangladesh Chhatra League, the student wing of the Awami League, from 2002 to 2006.

Career
Babu was elected to Parliament in 2008 from Narayanganj-2, and was re-elected in 2014.
And he was elected 2018.

References

9th Jatiya Sangsad members
10th Jatiya Sangsad members
11th Jatiya Sangsad members
1967 births
Living people